Arachnis breviscapa is a species of orchid. It is an epiphyte native to Sarawak and Sabah on the Island of Borneo in Malaysia.

References

breviscapa
Orchids of Borneo